The Haunting is a 1997 studio album by the Celtic band Clandestine.

Track listing
"Dunlavy's Castle" - 5:47
"The Haunting" - 5:22
"Innisfree" - 4:44
"The Baby Tunes" - 6:47
"The Nobleman's Wedding" - 6:00
"The Slip Jigs" - 2:49
"Cannonball" - 5:12
"Lexie McAskill" - 4:44
"The Cruel Sister" - 5:52
"Miss Amanda Mae" - 6:39

References

1997 albums
Clandestine (band) albums